Jack Helme may refer to:

 Jack Helme (footballer) (1897–?), English footballer
 Jack Helme (gymnast) (born 1989), English trampolinist